South Clifton Park is a neighborhood in east Baltimore, Maryland.

References

Neighborhoods in Baltimore
East Baltimore